Polyvinylpolypyrrolidone (polyvinyl polypyrrolidone, PVPP, crospovidone, crospolividone, or E1202) is a highly cross-linked modification of polyvinylpyrrolidone (PVP).

The cross-linked form of PVP is used as a disintegrant (see also excipients) in pharmaceutical tablets. PVPP is a highly cross-linked version of PVP, making it insoluble in water, though it still absorbs water and swells very rapidly generating a swelling force. This property makes it useful as a disintegrant in tablets.

PVPP can be used as a drug, taken as a tablet or suspension to absorb compounds (so-called endotoxins) that cause diarrhea. (Cf. bone char, charcoal.)

It is also used as a fining to extract impurities (via agglomeration followed by filtration). It is used in winemaking. Using the same principle it is used to remove polyphenols in beer production and thus clear beers with stable foam are produced. One such commercial product is called Polyclar. PVPP forms bonds similar to peptidic bonds in protein (especially, like proline residues) and that is why it can precipitate tannins the same way as proteins do.

PVPP has E number code E1202 and is used as a stabiliser.

See also
Polyethylene glycol-polyvinyl alcohol

References

Vinyl polymers
Food additives
Pyrrolidones
Excipients
E-number additives